The  is a one-off concept car produced by Mazda, and is the fourth car in Mazda's 'Nagare' design series. Mazda says the Taiki "reflects one possible direction for a future generation of Mazda sports cars aimed at helping to create a sustainable society".

The car

Drivetrain
The Taiki uses a front engine, rear-wheel drive layout and is powered by Mazda's next generation RENESIS rotary 16X engine, which is mated to a 7-speed, double-clutch gearbox. The 16X engine is said to replace the RX-8's 13B engine. The name Taiki means 'atmosphere' in Japanese.

Design

Exterior

The exterior design, created by Joseph Reeve under the direction of Atsuhiko Yamada, is inspired by flowing robes. The Taiki has butterfly doors and a very impressive drag coefficient of 0.25. Even the wheels and tires were designed with aerodynamics in mind.

Interior
The interior, designed by Troy Trinh, is influenced by 'koinobori' - Japanese carp streamers, and the black & white colour break is inspired by the symbol for Yin-Yang. The driver's side of the cabin is black, while the passenger side is white.

External links
Mazda Taiki at Sydney Motor Show

References
www.drive.com.au 
www.themotorreport.com.au
http://www.cardesignnews.com/site/home/design_reviews/display/store4/item93943/

Taiki
Rear-wheel-drive vehicles
Cars powered by Wankel engines